Craven Street: Ben Franklin in London is a five-part radio play dramatizing Benjamin Franklin's career as a colonial lobbyist in London before the American Revolution. It starred Elizabeth Montgomery, George Grizzard and Sir Nigel Hawthorne. It was written, produced and directed by Yuri Rasovsky, under the aegis of Robert Foxworth's American Dialogues Foundation. Syndicated to public radio stations in 1993, it was later released as an audiobook.

See also
 Benjamin Franklin House

External links
 Craven Street web page
 Friends of Benjamin Franklin House, 36 Craven Street, London website

American radio dramas
Works about Benjamin Franklin
1993 radio programme debuts
Cultural depictions of Benjamin Franklin